René Marteaux (born 3 August 1929) is a Belgian gymnast. He competed in seven events at the 1960 Summer Olympics.

References

External links
 

1929 births
Possibly living people
Belgian male artistic gymnasts
Olympic gymnasts of Belgium
Gymnasts at the 1960 Summer Olympics
People from Saint-Gilles, Belgium
Sportspeople from Brussels